Shanoor Sana Begum also popularly known by her mononym stage name Sana is an Indian actress, television personality and model, who predominantly works in Telugu cinema. She has acted mostly in Telugu films alongside few Tamil and Kannada films. Sana has acted in over 200 films mostly in supporting roles.

Biography 
She was born to a Christian father and Muslim mother in the Andhra Pradesh, Hyderabad. She was married to Sadath at her teenage even before completing her studies. Her son Syed Anwar Ahmed is a filmmaker and her daughter-in-law Sameera Sherief is a television actress.

Career 
She initially pursued her career in modelling. She got the opportunity in film acting from director Krishna Vamsi while she was busy with television and modelling assignments. Director Krishna Vamsi was in search for a suitable actress to play the supporting role in his 1996 film Ninne Pelladatha and signed Sana to play the supporting role and it eventually marked her acting debut. The film was acclaimed and was a successful venture at the box office which starred Nagarjuna in the lead role.

Since then she appeared mostly in Telugu films as supporting actress. Her performance was praised in the role of Kaikeyi in the 2011 film Sri Rama Rajyam and was also critically acclaimed for her performance for the negative role in the 2011 film Rajapattai. In 2016, she played a vamp in the Kannada film Silk Sakkath Maga. In 2018, she made her television acting debut with Tamil soap opera Ponmagal Vanthal.

In May 2020, she started her own YouTube channel teaching cooking methods along with her daughter-in-law Sameera Sherief.

Filmography 
All films are in Telugu, unless otherwise noted.

Television 
 Jeevitham (female lead's mom) Etv
 Chakravakam (Hema)
Ponmagal Vanthal (2018-2020) as Rajeshwari
 Adi Parashakti
 Siri Siri Muvvalu (2019-2020)
 Aravinda Sametha (2020–2021)

References 

1971 births
Living people
Indian film actresses
Indian television actresses
Female models from Hyderabad, India
Actresses in Telugu cinema
Actresses in Kannada cinema
Actresses in Tamil cinema
Telugu actresses
20th-century Indian actresses
Actresses from Hyderabad, India